Horrible is an EP by the rock group Half Japanese. It was released in 1982.

Track listing

Vinyl version
Side one
"Thing with a Hook"
"Don´t Go to Bed"
"Rosemary´s Baby"
Side two
"Vampire"
"Walk Through Walls"

References 

1981 EPs
Half Japanese albums